The 1978 Baltimore International was a men's tennis tournament played on indoor carpet courts at the Towson State College in Baltimore, Maryland in the United States. It was an independent tournament, not part of the 1978 Grand Prix circuit. It was the seventh edition of the event and was held from January 16 through January 22, 1978. Fifth-seeded Cliff Drysdale won the singles title and earned $25,000 first-prize money.

Finals

Singles
 Cliff Drysdale defeated  Tom Gorman 7–5, 6–3
 It was Drysdale's 1st singles title of the year and the 5th and last of his career in the Open Era.

Doubles
 Frew McMillan /  Fred McNair defeated  Roger Taylor /  Antonio Zugarelli 6–3, 7–5

References

External links
 ITF tournament edition details

1978 in American tennis
1978 in sports in Maryland
1978 Grand Prix (tennis)
January 1978 sports events in the United States